Abbey of Deer Platform was a small railway station on the branch line from Maud to Peterhead in the Scottish county of Aberdeenshire.

History
The station was opened by the London and North Eastern Railway. It was built to serve the needs of pilgrims visiting the nearby Roman Catholic Abbey and was not an advertised stop. Opening and closing dates are not recorded however it was actively used in the 1930s and 1940s.

It was the shortest platformed halt on the old Great North of Scotland Railway system and was a single wooden railway sleeper depth and length only, accessed by steps down from the adjacent road over bridge. By 1954 it had been fenced off at the platform edge and access steps.

The line itself closed to passengers in 1965 and freight in 1970.

Services

References

Notes

Sources

External links
 Abbey of Deer Platform on navigable 1946 O. S. map

Disused railway stations in Aberdeenshire
Former London and North Eastern Railway stations
Railway stations in Great Britain opened in 1932
Railway stations in Great Britain closed in 1938
1938 disestablishments in Scotland